Marchi is an Italian surname. Notable people with this surname include:
 Alessandro Marchi, Italian footballer
 Amedeo Marchi (1889 – ??), Italian gymnast 
 Angelo Marchi (born 1950), retired Italian professional football player
 Cristian Marchi (born 1976), Italian house music producer and DJ
 Ettore Marchi, Italian footballer
 Giuseppe Marchi, Italian Jesuit archaeologist
 Guido Marchi (born 1986), Italian professional footballer
 Guilherme Marchi, professional bull rider
 Jamie Marchi, American actress, voice actress, ADR Director
 John Peter Marchi (Serbo-Croatian: Ivan Petar Marki; 1663-1733), Venetian jurist, member of the Split nobility 
 John J. Marchi (1921–2009), New York State senator
 Luiz Felipe Ramos Marchi (born 1997), Brazilian footballer, defender for Italian club S.S. Lazio
 Mario Vellani Marchi (1895–1979), Italian painter and scenic designer
 Mattia Marchi, Italian footballer
 Paolo Marchi, Italian footballer
 Pio Marchi (1845–1942),  Italian professional footballer 
 Sergio Marchi (footballer), Italian footballer
 Sergio Marchi (politician), Canadian diplomat and former politician
 Tony Marchi, English footballer
 Robert Marchi, Quebec Court Judge, Professions Tribunal Vice-Chair.

See also
 MArchI, Moscow Architectural Institute
 De Marchi, similar surname
 Bothriechis marchi, venomenous viper
 Giacomo Marchi, pseudonym of Giorgio Bassani, Italian novelist and international intellectual
 Viaer Marchi, annual festival held in Guernsey on the first Monday of July

Italian-language surnames